The Women's 1 metre springboard diving event is one of 260 events in 17 disciplines at the 2010 Commonwealth Games. It was held on 12 October 2010.

Results
Green denotes finalists

References
 Reports

Aquatics at the 2010 Commonwealth Games
Comm